Park Towers may refer to:

 Emirates Park Towers, a hotel complex in Dubai, UAE
 Park Towers (Sandy Springs), a residential complex in Sandy Springs, Georgia, USA
 Park Towers (Houston), an office complex in Houston, Texas
 Park Towers (Tijuana), a luxury complex in Tijuana, Baja California
 Park Towers (Las Vegas), high-rise condominium towers in Paradise, Nevada

See also
Park Tower (disambiguation)